Barberi is a surname.  The name may refer to:

 Andrea Barberi (born 1979), Italian sprint athlete
 Antonio Barberi (fl. 18th century), Italian engraver
 Dominic Barberi (1792–1849), Italian theologian and Passionist; beatified in 1963
 Giorgio Bàrberi Squarotti (1929–2017), Italian academic and poet
 Giovanni Luca Barberi (1452–1520), Italian historian
 Giuseppe Barberi (1746-1809), Italian architect
 Jacopo de' Barberi, or Barbari (c. 1460/70 – before 1516), Italian painter and printmaker
 Katie Barberi (born 1972), Mexican television actress
 Stefano Barberi (born 1984), Brazilian professional bicycle racer

See also
 Barbera (disambiguation)
 Barbero, a name

surnames